Francisco Albano Barrio (born 22 June 1989), commonly known as Croata Barrio, is an Argentina-born Croatian mixed martial artist who competes in the Lightweight division of KSW.

Background
Barrio was born in Buenos Aires, Argentina. In 1994, he and his family moved to Zagreb, Croatia. It was here that he began Greco-Roman wrestling, in which he competed for the Argentina national team from 2005 to 2012. Today, he is a professional mixed martial artist and is signed with Final Fight Championship, one of the fastest growing MMA promotions in Europe.

Greco-Roman Wrestling career
At the age of seven, Barrio became interested in the sport, and practiced various disciplines. He began training in Lokomotiva Wrestling Club, Zagreb. He soon started to win tournaments, which led to him participating in national championships, and then in international events. In Croatia he gained experience by competing regularly with wrestlers from all across Europe. He stood out as a wrestler with great potential.

At seventeen he returned with his family to their home country, Argentina, where he continued with the training activities. He has managed several victories both locally and internationally, Multiple Argentine champion in the junior and senior categories, being undefeated in the 66 kg category. He excelled in international competitions such as the Pan American and South American, taking three medals in the first tournament and two in the second.

He competed in various international tournaments in America, Asia and Europe, and later in the Olympic Wrestling trials in Orlando, Florida ahead of the 2012 games in London. He lost on points in a close fight against Wuileixis Rivas, in which the winner qualified directly to the Olympic Games.

Francisco accumulated over 100 wins in all his Greco-Roman Wrestling career.

He competed in Croatian Wrestling League, in -74 kg weight category, on 12 October 2013 while preparing for his Final Fight Championship debut. In 2nd league round he scored victory for  Lokomotiva Wrestling Club, the same club where he made his first steps in wrestling.

Mixed martial arts career

Early career
Francisco Barrio started his mixed martial arts career while training at Nova União and the Pana Wrestling Team in Buenos Aires. His debut was in the lightweight division, on 14 July 2012, at Real Combat Conviction. He won via submission, with a rear-naked choke just 1:14 into the first round.

On October 20, 2012 Francisco win Alexander Ceballos via Submission (keylock). At KIF 2 - Killer Instinct Fight 2, Croata defeated Esteban Zuñiga via TKO in first round.

FFC
On June 27, 2013, Croata signed with the European MMA promotion, Final Fight Championship. Francisco won in his Final Fight Championship debut by unanimous decision against Darko Banović in the Featherweight division. Francisco next defeated Patrick Peresa, after 54 seconds of the third round, by submission (Rear-Naked Choke) at FFC13.

The official public page of Final Fight Championship announced that Francisco will fight Vaso Bakočević in FFC on October 31, 2014, in a featherweight title eliminator. The fight failed to materialize, and Barrio was rescheduled to fight Filip Pejić at FFC 15. Pejić won the fight by a first-round knockout.

After his loss to Pejić, Barrio took a five year break from the sport. He returned in December 2019, when he was scheduled to fight Adi Duraković at FNC 2. The fight ended after 18 seconds, as Duraković collapsed to the floor. Barrio fought again at FNC 3, against Aleksandar Janković. He beat Janković by a third-round submission via neck crank.

KSW
Barrrio signed with KSW on October 31, 2020 and faced Mateusz Legierski at KSW 56: Polska vs. Chorwacja on November 14, 2020. He lost the fight via majority decision. His second fight with KSW came at KSW 58: Kołecki vs. Zawada, when he faced Bartłomiej Kopera. Barrio won the fight by unanimous decision.

Barrio was scheduled to face Vaso Bakočević  at FNC: Armagedon Quarterfinals on September 11, 2021. He won the fight by a first-round submission.

Barrio stepped in as a short notice opponent for Łukasz Rajewski at KSW 70: Pudzianowski vs. Materla on May 28, 2022. He won the bout via rear-naked choke in the second round.

Barrio faced Maciej Kazieczko at KSW 76: Parnasse vs. Rajewski on November 12, 2022. He lost the fight by a third-round knockout.

Personal life
Francisco is son of popular brigadier Rodolfo Barrio Saavedra who was actively involved in the Croatian War of Independence.

Rankings

 Barrio was ranked second in division at the 2007 Pan American Championship in Maracaibo, Venezuela
 Barrio was ranked second in the 2008 Pan American Championship in Ecuador.
 Barrio was ranked 20th World Championship held in Beijing, China
 Barrio was ranked third in the 2010 Pan American Championship in Monterrey, Mexico
 Barrio was ranked number one in the 2010 South American Games.
Argentinian champion: 2006, 2007, 2008, 2009, 2010, 2011 and 2012.
 2014 No. 7 prospect in the world up to 66 kg.

Honors

Olimpia de plata: 2008.
Revelacion Clarin: 2010.

Mixed martial arts record

|-
|Loss
|align=center|10–3
|Maciej Kazieczko
|KO (punches)
|KSW 76: Parnasse vs. Rajewski
|
|align=center|3
|align=center|3:20
|Grodzisk Mazowiecki, Poland
| Fight of the Night
|-
|Win
|align=center|10–2
|Łukasz Rajewski
|Submission (rear-naked choke)
|KSW 70: Pudzianowski vs. Materla
|
|align=center|2
|align=center|2:51
|Łódź, Poland
|
|-
|Win
|align=center|9–2
|Vaso Bakočević
|Technical Submission (guillotine choke)
|FNC: Armagedon Quarterfinals
|
|align=center|1
|align=center|1:00
|Šibenik, Croatia
|
|-
| Win
|align=center|8–2
| Bartłomiej Kopera
| Decision (unanimous)
| KSW 58: Kołecki vs. Zawada
|
|align=center|3
|align=center|5:00
|Łódź, Poland
|
|-
| Loss
| align=center| 7–2
| Mateusz Legierski
| Decision (majority)
|KSW 56: Materla vs. Soldić
|
|align=center|3
|align=center|5:00
|Łódź, Poland
|
|-
| Win
|align=center|7–1
|Aleksandar Janković
|Submission (neck crank)
|Fight Nation Championship 3
|
|align=center|3
|align=center|2:19
|Zagreb, Croatia
|
|-
| Win
|align=center|6–1
|Adi Duraković
|TKO (retirement)
|Fight Nation Championship 2: Edge of Tomorrow
|
|align=center|1
|align=center|0:18
|Zagreb, Croatia
|
|-
| Loss
|align=center| 5–1
| Filip Pejić
| KO (punch)
|FFC 15: Poreč
|
|align=center|1
|align=center|4:20
|Poreč, Croatia
|
|-
| Win
|align=center|5–0
|Patrick Pereša
|Submission (rear-naked choke)
|FFC 13: Jurković vs. Tavares
|
|align=center|3
|align=center|0:50
|Zadar, Croatia
|
|-
| Win
|align=center|4–0
|Darko Banović
|Decision (unanimous)
|FFC 8: Zelg vs. Rodriguez
|
|align=center|3
|align=center|5:00
|Zagreb, Croatia
|
|-
| Win
|align=center|3–0
|Esteban Zuñiga
|TKO (doctor stoppage)
|KIF 2 - Killer Instinct Fight 2
|
|align=center|1
|align=center|1:05
|Neuquen, Argentina
|
|-
| Win
|align=center|2–0
|Alexander Ceballos
|Submission (americana)
|KIF - Killer Instinct Fight
|
|align=center|1
|align=center|3:35
|Neuquen, Argentina
|
|-
| Win
|align=center|1–0
|Santiago Mendez
|Submission (rear-naked choke)
|Conviction MMA 3 - Argentina vs. Peru
|
|align=center|1
|align=center|0:51
|Buenos Aires, Argentina
|
|-

See also
 List of current KSW fighters
 List of male mixed martial artists

References

External links

1988 births
Living people
Argentine male mixed martial artists
Argentine emigrants to Croatia
Argentine expatriate sportspeople in Ireland
Sportspeople from Buenos Aires
Argentine male sport wrestlers
Croatian male mixed martial artists
Croatian male sport wrestlers
South American Games gold medalists for Argentina
South American Games medalists in wrestling
Competitors at the 2010 South American Games
Featherweight mixed martial artists
Mixed martial artists utilizing Greco-Roman wrestling